Robert Augustine Thompson (February 14, 1805 – August 31, 1876) was a U.S. Representative from Virginia, father of Thomas Larkin Thompson.

Biography
Born near Culpeper Court House, Virginia, Thompson attended a private school at Gallipolis, Ohio, and the University of Virginia at Charlottesville, Virginia.
He studied law.
He was admitted to the bar in 1826 and commenced practice in Charleston, Virginia (now West Virginia).
He served as member of the State senate 1839–1846.

Thompson was elected as a Democrat to the Thirtieth Congress (March 4, 1847 – March 3, 1849).
He declined to be a candidate for reelection.
He served as delegate to the Democratic National Convention in 1852.
He served as member of the board of visitors to the University of Virginia in 1852.
He moved to San Francisco, California, in 1853.
He was appointed in 1853 a member of a commission to settle private land claims in California.
He was appointed by the Governor a reporter of the California Supreme Court in 1870.
He served as member of the justices' court of San Francisco from 1870 until his death in San Francisco, California, August 31, 1876.
He was interred in Laurel Hill Cemetery.

Sources

1805 births
1876 deaths
Politicians from Charleston, West Virginia
People from Culpeper County, Virginia
Virginia lawyers
Democratic Party members of the United States House of Representatives from Virginia
19th-century American politicians
19th-century American lawyers
Burials at Laurel Hill Cemetery (San Francisco)
Burials at Cypress Lawn Memorial Park
University of Virginia alumni
Lawyers from Charleston, West Virginia
Democratic Party Virginia state senators
People from San Francisco
People of pre-statehood West Virginia